Voldemārs Zāmuēls (22 May 1872, in Dzērbene parish, Latvia (then Russian Empire) – 16 January 1948, in Ravensburg, Germany (in then French occupation zone)) was a Latvian politician. He held the office of the Prime Minister of Latvia from 27 January 1924 to 18 December 1924.

References

1872 births
1948 deaths
People from Cēsis Municipality
People from Kreis Wenden
Democrats Union politicians
Prime Ministers of Latvia
Deputies of the Constitutional Assembly of Latvia
Candidates for President of Latvia
University of Tartu alumni
Recipients of the Order of the Three Stars
Latvian World War II refugees
Latvian emigrants to Germany